Miles Alexander Teller (born February 20, 1987) is an American actor. He made his feature film debut with the independent drama Rabbit Hole in 2010 and gained recognition for his starring role in the 2013 coming-of-age film The Spectacular Now and the Divergent film trilogy (2014–2016), both opposite Shailene Woodley. His starring role in the 2014 drama Whiplash served as his breakthrough and earned him praise. He went on to star in the superhero film Fantastic Four (2015) and the biographical film War Dogs (2016).

In 2022, Teller gained wider success for starring in the action film Top Gun: Maverick. On television, he has starred in the Amazon Prime Video crime drama Too Old to Die Young (2019) and the Paramount+ miniseries The Offer (2022).

Early life
Teller was born in Downingtown, Pennsylvania to parents Merry, a real estate agent, and Michael, a nuclear power plant engineer. He has two older sisters, Erin and Dana. His paternal grandfather was of Russian Jewish descent, and his ancestry also includes English and Irish forebears.

Teller spent his early years in Pennsylvania and Delaware before his family moved to Citrus County, Florida, at age twelve. Growing up, he was involved with acting, was president of his high school's drama club, and played alto saxophone, drums, piano and guitar. He also played baseball competitively and had dreams of turning professional. He graduated from Lecanto High School in Lecanto, Florida.

Subsequently, he attended the New York University Tisch School of the Arts; there, he studied method acting at the Lee Strasberg Theatre and Film Institute and screen acting with Stonestreet Studios. He earned a BFA in drama in 2009.

He has multiple scars on his face from the crash.

Career

Teller appeared in many short films between 2004 and 2010. After graduating from Tisch School of the Arts in 2009, he made his major film debut in Rabbit Hole (2010), after Nicole Kidman handpicked him for the role. Teller starred in the stage musical Footloose in high school, and later starred in the 2011 remake film of the same name. In 2013, he starred in 21 & Over and The Spectacular Now, opposite Shailene Woodley.

In Damien Chazelle's second film Whiplash (2014), Teller played a drummer who tries to impress his abusive jazz teacher (J. K. Simmons), which earned him nominations for the Gotham Independent Film Award for Best Actor, the Satellite Award for Best Actor – Motion Picture and the BAFTA Rising Star Award.

Teller received further recognition for playing Peter Hayes in Divergent (2014), and the film's sequels, Insurgent (2015) and Allegiant (2016). He has also played Mister Fantastic in the reboot film Fantastic Four (2015) and arms dealer David Packouz in War Dogs (2016). He trained for 5 months to get in shape for the role of biopic boxer Vinny Paz in film Bleed for This (2016).

In 2017, he starred in two biopic films, Only the Brave and Thank You for Your Service. In November 2020, it was announced that Teller will star in a political satire called The Fence. In September 2021, it was reported that filming on The Offer, the Paramount+ miniseries about the production of the film The Godfather in which Teller plays producer Albert S. Ruddy, was temporarily halted due to COVID concerns. The miniseries ran from April to June 2022. In November 2021, he appeared in Taylor Swift's music video "I Bet You Think About Me" directed by Blake Lively.

In 2022, he starred in Top Gun: Maverick. He was initially hesitant to accept the role, as he was wary of the potential success and attention he would receive from starring in a major film alongside Tom Cruise. He was convinced to accept it by Cruise himself, who persuaded him that he was perfect for the role. In May 2022, Miles Teller stated that he had been pitching a follow-up film centered around his character to the studio. The actor referred to his pitch as Top Gun: Rooster. By July of the same year, he stated that he has been having ongoing discussions regarding a sequel with Tom Cruise. In regard to the popularity and support, Teller said that the experience has "been awesome" and that "I've never really experienced something like this in my life."

Teller made his hosting debut on the opener of the 48th season of Saturday Night Live.

Personal life

Since 2013, he has been in a relationship with model Keleigh Sperry. They were engaged at the Molori Safari Lodge in the Madikwe Game Reserve, South Africa, on August 20, 2017, and were married on September 1, 2019, in Maui, Hawaii. During the Super Bowl LVII telecast, the couple and their dog starred in a commercial for Bud Light in which they pass the time while waiting for a customer service representative to speak to them, dancing to the on-hold music.

Filmography

Film

Television

Short films

Music video

Awards and nominations

References

External links
 
 
 

1987 births
21st-century American male actors
American male film actors
American people of English descent
American people of Irish descent
American people of Polish descent
American people of Russian-Jewish descent
Lee Strasberg Theatre and Film Institute alumni
Living people
Male actors from Pennsylvania
People from Citrus County, Florida
People from Downingtown, Pennsylvania
Tisch School of the Arts alumni